Rhytiphora lateralis is a species of beetle in the family Cerambycidae. It was described in 1858 by Francis Polkinghorne Pascoe as Symphyletes lateralis. It is known from Australia.

References

External links
Rhytiphora lateralis images and occurrence data from GBIF

lateralis
Beetles described in 1858